Amaury Pernette (born 18 May 1986) is a French curler.

Teams

Men's

Mixed doubles

References

External links
 

Amaury Pernette, Rémy Hubscher, Sébastien Barbier - Entreprendre avec Coopilote | Jeunes FC

Living people
1986 births
French male curlers
French curling champions